The State of India, also referred as the Portuguese State of India (Estado Português da Índia, EPI) or simply Portuguese India, was a state of the Portuguese Empire founded six years after the discovery of a sea route to the Indian subcontinent by Vasco da Gama, a subject of the Kingdom of Portugal. The capital of Portuguese India served as the governing centre of a string of military forts and trading posts scattered all over the Indian Ocean.

The first viceroy, Francisco de Almeida established his base of operations at Fort Manuel, after the Kingdom of Cochin negotiated to become a protectorate of Portugal in 1505. With the Portuguese conquest of Goa from the Bijapur Sultanate in 1510, Goa became the major anchorage for the Portuguese Armadas arriving in India. The capital of the viceroyalty was transferred from Cochin in the Malabar region to Goa in 1530. From 1535, Mumbai (Bombay) was a harbour of Portuguese India as Bom Bahia, until it was handed over, via the dowry of Catherine de Braganza to Charles II of England in 1661.  The expression "State of India" began regularly appearing in documents in the mid-16th century.

Until the 18th century, the viceroy at Goa had authority over all Portuguese possessions in and around the Indian Ocean, from Southern Africa to Southeast Asia. In 1752, Mozambique got its own separate government, from 1844 onwards Portuguese Goa stopped administering Macao, Solor & Timor.

In later years, Portugal's authority was confined to holdings in the Canara, Cambay, and Konkan regions, along the west coast of India. At the time of the dissolution of the British Raj in 1947, Portuguese India comprised three administrative divisions, sometimes referred to collectively as Goa: namely Goa which included Anjediva; and Damaon, which included the exclaves of Dadra and Nagar Haveli and Dio districts. The Salazar regime of Portugal lost de facto control of Dadra and Nagar Haveli in 1954. Finally, the rest of the overseas territory was lost in December 1961 with the Indian Annexation of Goa under PM Nehru. Portugal only recognised Indian control after the Carnation Revolution and the fall of the Estado Novo regime by a treaty signed on 31 December 1974.

Context

Vasco da Gama lands in India 
The first Portuguese encounter with the subcontinent was on 20 May 1498 when Vasco da Gama reached Calicut on the Malabar Coast. Anchored off the coast of Calicut, the Portuguese invited native fishermen on board and immediately bought some Indian items. One Portuguese accompanied the fishermen to the port and met with a Tunisian Muslim. On the advice of this man, Gama sent a couple of his men to Ponnani to meet with ruler of Calicut, the Zamorin. Over the objections of Arab merchants, Gama managed to secure a letter of concession for trading rights from the Zamorin, Calicut's ruler. But, the Portuguese were unable to pay the prescribed customs duties and price of his goods in gold.

Later Calicut officials temporarily detained Gama's Portuguese agents as security for payment. This, however, annoyed Gama, who carried a few natives and sixteen fishermen with him by force.

Nevertheless, Gama's expedition was successful beyond all reasonable expectation, bringing in cargo that was worth sixty times the cost of the expedition.

Pedro Álvares Cabral 

Pedro Álvares Cabral sailed to India, marking the arrival of Europeans to Brazil on the way, to trade for pepper and other spices, negotiating and establishing a factory at Calicut, where he arrived on 13 September 1500. Matters worsened when the Portuguese factory at Kozhikode was attacked by surprise by the locals, resulting in the death of more than fifty Portuguese. Cabral was outraged by the attack on the factory and seized ten Arab merchant ships anchored in the harbour, killing about six hundred of their crew and confiscating their cargo before burning the ships. Cabral also ordered his ships to bombard Calicut for an entire day in retaliation for the violation of the agreement. In Cochin and Cannanore Cabral succeeded in making advantageous treaties with the local rulers. Cabral started the return voyage on 16 January 1501 and arrived in Portugal with only 4 of 13 ships on 23 June 1501.

In 1502, the Portuguese built a trade post in Pulicat because its location at the mouth of a lagoon made it a great natural harbor.

João da Nova

The third Portuguese expedition to reach India sailed under the command of João da Nova and was composed of four ships, tasked mainly with acquiring spices and returning to Europe. While en route the fleet discovered the islands of Ascension and Saint Helena in the South Atlantic, and despite having been planned as a purely commercial expedition, the fleet clashed with vessels of the Zamorin of Calicut off the Malabar Coast in what was the first significant naval battle of the Portuguese India.

The fleet may also have called at Ceylon.

Vasco da Gama

Vasco da Gama sailed to India for a second time with 15 ships and 800 men, arriving at Calicut on 30 October 1502. Gama this time made a call to expel all Muslims from Calicut which was turned down. The ruler showed willingness to sign a treaty but Gama bombarded the city and captured several rice vessels after he was informed that the Zamorin was messaging neighboring rulers to join him in resisting the Portuguese at the same time. 
While in India Gama also attacked Onor, reduced Baticala to tributary status, established a trade treaty and trading post at Cananore, and clashed with a fleet belonging to the Zamorin. He returned to Portugal in September 1503.

Afonso de Albuquerque

The expedition of 1503 was the first time Afonso de Albuquerque sailed to India, as its commander. Its activities were limited to erecting a fort on the territory of the allied kingdom of Cochin, signing a peace with Zamorin that would prove brief, and opening a new trading post on Kollam.

Lopo Soares de Albergaria

The sixth Portuguese expedition to sail to India was commanded by Lopo Soares de Albergaria, who bombarded Calicut, relieved Duarte Pacheco Pereira and the Portuguese garrison at Cochin defending the territory from a large attack by the Zamorin, sacked Cranganore, struck an allegiance with the king of Tanur which removed him from the suzerainty of the Zamorin, and finally captured a large Egyptian trade fleet at Pandarane.

Foundation (1505–1515)

Francisco de Almeida 

On 25 March 1505, Francisco de Almeida was appointed Viceroy of India, on the condition that he would set up four forts on the southwestern Indian coast: at Anjediva, Cannanore, Cochin and Quilon. Francisco de Almeida left Portugal with a fleet of 22 vessels with 1,500 men.

On 13 September, Francisco de Almeida reached Anjadip island, where he immediately started the construction of Fort Anjediva. On 23 October, with the permission of the friendly ruler of Kōlattir, he started building Fort St Angelo of Cannanore, leaving Lourenço de Brito in charge with 150 men and two ships.

On 31 October 1505 Francisco de Almeida then reached Cochin, with only 8 vessels left. There he learned that the Portuguese traders at Quilon had been killed. He decided to send his son Lourenço de Almeida with 6 ships, who destroyed 27 Calicut vessels in the harbour of Quilon. Almeida took up residence in Cochin and strengthened Fort Manuel.

The Zamorin prepared a large fleet of 200 ships to oppose the Portuguese, but in March 1506 Lourenço de Almeida (son of Francisco) was victorious in a sea battle at the entrance to the harbour, in the Battle of Cannanore (1506), an important setback for the fleet of the Zamorin. Thereupon Lourenço de Almeida explored the coastal waters southwards to Colombo, in what is now Sri Lanka. In Cannanore, however, a new ruler, hostile to the Portuguese and friendly with the Zamorin, attacked the Portuguese garrison, leading to the Siege of Cannanore.

In 1507 Almeida's mission was strengthened by the arrival of Tristão da Cunha's squadron. Afonso de Albuquerque's squadron had, however, split from that of Cunha off East Africa and was independently conquering territories in the Persian Gulf to the west.

In March 1508 a Portuguese squadron under command of Lourenço de Almeida was attacked by a combined Mameluk Egyptian and Gujarat Sultanate fleet at Chaul and Dabul respectively, led by admirals Mirocem and Meliqueaz in the Battle of Chaul. Lourenço de Almeida died after a fierce fight in this battle. Mamluk-Indian resistance was, however, to be decisively defeated at the Battle of Diu.

Afonso de Albuquerque 

In the year 1509, Afonso de Albuquerque was appointed the second governor of Portuguese possessions in the East. After acquiring their first protectorate in Portuguese Cochin, a new fleet under Marshal Fernão Coutinho arrived with specific instructions to destroy the power of Zamorin of Calicut. The Zamorin's palace was captured and destroyed and the city was set on fire. The Zamorin's forces rallied, killing Coutinho and wounding Albuquerque. Albuquerque withdrew with his forces and after the Zamorin was assassinated in 1513 he entered into agreement with his successor to protect Portuguese interests in Malabar, and a fort was built on Calicut.

In 1510, Afonso de Albuquerque captured Goa from the Bijapur Sultanate sultan with the aid of the Hindu privateer Timoja, leading to the establishment of a permanent settlement in the city of Velha Goa (Old Goa in English). Goa (island) bore the seat of the viceroy, who governed all the possessions in Asia.

Albuquerque added to the State of India the city of Malacca in 1511 and Ormus in 1515. He encouraged the settlement of his soldiers and their marriage to native women. In the mid sixteenth century there were about 2000 casados ("married men") in Goa. Goa included a large body of native non-Portuguese inhabitants for the Portuguese crown to rule. To better achieve this, Albuquerque resorted to medieval Iberian procedures: people of different religious communities were allowed to live by their laws under representatives of their respective communities. Exception was made to the practice of sati however, which was promptly abolished. Certain taxes due to the Adil Shah of Bijapur were also abolished. Native women were legally allowed property rights for the first time. At Goa, Albuquerque instituted an orphan's fund and opened a hospital, the Hospital Real de Goa, modelled after the grand Hospital Real de Todos os Santos in Lisbon. Also at Goa were built smaller hospitals run by the city's charity, the Misericórdia, dedicated to serving the poor and the natives.

Albuquerque's policies proved immensely popular amongst his soldiers as well as the local population, especially his characteristically strict observance of justice. When Albuquerque died in sight of Goa in 1515, even the Hindu natives of Goa mourned his passing alongside the Portuguese. His tomb at the Nossa Senhora da Serra hermitage was converted to a shrine by the local Hindus, who would leave flowers there in his dedication and direct prayers to him, seeking aid in matters of justice, until his remains were returned to Portugal in 1566.

The Portuguese had also shipped Órfãs do Rei to their colonies in the Indian peninsula, the most important of which were the eastern metropole of Goa and the largest province in Bombay-Bassein. Órfãs do Rei (literally "Orphans of the King"), were orphaned Portuguese girls patronised by the King, and sent to overseas colonies to form marital alliances with either Portuguese settlers or natives of high status.

Early years 

In 1520, the Portuguese extended their dominion over the town of Rachol, as in that year, Krishnadevaraya captured the Rachol Fort and delivered it to the Portuguese, in exchange for mutual defence pact against the Deccan Sultanates.

In 1526, John III of Portugal granted the city of Goa and its town hall the same legal status as Lisbon, in a foral in which the general laws and privileges of the city, its town hall, and the local Hindu community were detailed – especially important since at the time the native laws of Goa were still not written, instead being handled by councils of elders or religious judges and passed down orally (thus prone to abuses).

There were Portuguese settlements in and around the Coromandel region. The Luz Church in the Mylapore neighbourhood of Madras (Chennai) was the first church that the Portuguese built in the area in 1516, the São Tomé or San Thome shrine was rebuilt by them 1522. They also built the first structures at the Basilica of Our Lady of the Mount, Bandra, the Our Lady of Velankanni shrine and the Cathedral of Our Lady of Miracles; which are among the important Christian pilgrimage sites of South Asia.

Several colonies were also acquired from the Sultan of Guzerat in the north Konkan region: Damaon was sacked in 1531 and ceded in 1539; Salsette, the seven islands of Bombay, Chaul and Bassein (Vasai) in 1534; Diu ceded in 1535. These would jointly come to be known as the Northern Province of Portuguese India. The territory (province) of Portuguese Bombay had its city centre in and around the Bassein Fort; subject to the viceroy in the capital (metropole) of Velha Goa in south Konkan country, along with other colonies in the Indian subcontinent, such as Portuguese Ceylon and Portuguese Chittagong.

The Ottoman Empire carried out the Siege of Diu in 1538, with a strong fleet under the command of the Ottoman governor of Egypt Sulaiman Pasha for four months, with the aid of a large army provided by the Sultan of Guzerat; however they were ultimately forced to retreat with considerable losses. The successful defense of Dio by captain António da Silveira against overwhelming odds was a battle of annihilation, is one of the most celebrated exploits in Portuguese history, and frequently compared to the Great Siege of Malta. On the occasion, the Portuguese captured the Tiro de Diu, a massive Guzerati bombard.

According to Portuguese records there was a Cholera epidemic in 1543, "It is said that deaths from the disposal of the disease were so numerous that the disposal of bodies was a formidable task"

On 16 May 1546, the Jesuit missionary Francis Xavier requested the institution of the Goa Inquisition for the "Old Christians" and "New Christians", in a letter to John III of Portugal. Non-Christians were officially oppressed, even before the Inquisition was set up. Francis Xavier was instrumental for a mass conversion of 30,000 Paravar fishermen at Cape Comorin.

In 1556, the printing press in Goa was the first installed in India at Saint Paul's College, Goa. Through publications made on the printing press, opened a window on the knowledge and customs of Europe. The Jesuits brought this European-style, metal movable type technology to Macao in China in 1588 and to Japan in 1590. 

By the start of the 17th century, the population of Goa and the surrounding areas was about 250,000. Holding this strategic land against repeated attacks by the Indian states required constant infusions of men and material. Portugal's important victories, such as the battle of Cochin in 1504, the defense of Diu in 1509, the conquest of Goa in 1510, the defenses of Diu in 1538 and 1546, and the defense of Goa in 1571 were accomplished with limited manpower. In their largest deployments, the Portuguese could field perhaps 2,000 to 3,000 European and mestiço troops supported by a similar amount of local auxiliaries, while the larger Indian states could field tens of thousands each. Portuguese superiority in military technology (especially in regards to ships and artillery), training (especially in the skill of their gunners), and tactics, combined with the disunity of the Indian states opposing them, allowed them to keep their position and consistently win their wars.

Later years

17th century

In 1640, Shivappa Nayaka captured all the Portuguese forts in the Canara subregion.

The seven islands of Bombay (Mumbai) were presented to the English Crown in 1661, as part of the dowry of Catherine Braganza to Charles II of England, who in turn leased the area to the English East India Company. In 1683, Mahrattas attempted a siege against Portuguese settlements in the Konkan region with no success.
 

Kollam (Quilon) was a prominent seaport and became a Portuguese settlement from 1519, they built a cemetery at Tangasseri in Quilon city. After the Dutch East India Company invasion, the Dutch also buried their dead there. The pirates of Tangasseri inhabited the cemetery before Europeans arrived. Remnants of this cemetery still exist today, very close to Tangasseri Lighthouse and St Thomas Fort, which are listed among the protected monuments in the Archaeological Survey of India.

18th and 19th century

Most of the Northern Province composed of Taana, Bassein (Vasai) and Chaul near British Bombay was lost following another Mahratta Invasion of Bassein in 1739. Goa, Daman and Diu as well as Anjediva, were retained because a fleet of Portuguese Armadas arrived from Lisbon, bearing a newly appointed viceroy.

In the aftermath of the battles and the losses, the Portuguese expanded the territory of Goa between 1763 and 1788, at the expense of the Dessais of Kudal, the Sondas and the Bhonslas/ Mahrattas of Silvassa, which became known as Novas Conquistas. By order of the Marquis de Pombal, the Jesuits were expelled from Portugal's territories in 1759. They were replaced by the Oratorians, a native Goan Catholic religious order founded by Christian Brahmin and Christian Cxatria converts, and a college dedicated to the secular education of the native elites was opened, and the Goan Inquisition was abolished. By influence of Pombal, King José declared that native Christians were equal in standing with Europeans, while the Viceroy Count of Ega declared religious freedom and prohibited racial slander. For these reasons "Pombal and his collaborators remain to this day much respected figures in Goa" 

In 1752, Mozambique was detached from the State of India and henceforth ruled by its own governor.

Military intelligence about the France's plan to occupy Goa caused the British Governor-general at Calcutta, Marquis of Wellesley to send troops, Goa was briefly a protectorate from 1799 to 1813. The Portuguese governor Francisco António da Veiga Cabral managed to retain control of civil institutions by formally appointing the British officer in charge of the occupation, Sir William Clarke, as commander of Portuguese troops in Goa under his authority.

In 1843, the capital was shifted to Panjim (Nova Goa or New Goa), when it officially became the administrative seat of the Estado, replacing the city of Velha Goa (Old Goa), although the viceroys had taken residence there already since 1 Dec, 1759. In 1844, the Portuguese governor of India stopped administering the territories of Macao, Solor, and Timor. Only then was the territory of the State of India confined to the Indian subcontinent itself.

Second World War
Portugal was neutral during the Second World War.  As a result, at the outbreak of hostilities a number of Axis ships sought refuge in Goa rather than be sunk or captured by the British Royal Navy. Three German merchant ships, the Ehrenfels, the Drachenfels and the Braunfels, as well as an Italian ship, took refuge in the port of Mormugao. The Ehrenfels began transmitting Allied ship movements to the U-boats operating in the Indian Ocean, an action that was extremely damaging to Allied shipping.

But the British Royal Navy was unable to take any official action against these ships because of Goa's stated neutrality. Instead the Indian mission of SOE backed a covert raid using members from the Calcutta Light Horse, a part-time unit made up of civilians who were not eligible for normal war service.  The Light Horse embarked on an ancient Calcutta riverboat, the Phoebe, and sailed round India to Goa, where they sank the Ehrenfels. The British then sent an unencrypted radio message announcing it was going to seize the territory. This bluff made the other Axis crews scuttle their ships fearing they could be seized by British forces.

The raid was covered in the book Boarding Party by James Leasor.  Due to the potential political ramifications of the fact that Britain had violated Portuguese neutrality, the raid remained secret until the book was published in 1978. In 1980 the story was made into the film, The Sea Wolves, starring Gregory Peck, David Niven and Roger Moore.

1945 to 1961

On 24 July 1954 an organisation called "The United Front of Goans" took control of the enclave of Dadra. Nagar Haveli was seized by Azad Gomantak Dal on 2 August 1954.
The International Court of Justice at The Hague delivered an impasse verdict, regarding access to Dadra and Nagar Haveli by Portugal.

From 1954, the satyagrahis (peaceful protesters) against Portuguese rule, outside Goa were violently suppressed through brute force. Many internal revolts were quelled and leaders extrajudicially murdered or jailed. As a result, India broke off diplomatic relations with Portugal, closed its consulate-general in Panjim and demanded that Portugal must close its delegation in New Delhi. India also imposed an economic embargo against the territories of Portuguese Goa. The Indian Government adopted a diplomatic "wait and watch" approach from 1955 to 1961 with numerous representations to the Portuguese Salazar dictatorship, and made attempts to highlight the issue of decolonisation before the international community.

To facilitate the transport of people and goods to and from the Indian enclaves, the Salazar dictatorship established an airline, Transportes Aéreos da Índia Portuguesa, and airports at Goa, Daman and Diu.

Finally, in December 1961, India militarily invaded the remaining Portuguese possessions. Portuguese forces had been given orders to either defeat the invaders or die. Eventually, the Governor of Portuguese India signed the Instrument of Surrender on 19 December 1961, thus ending 450 years of Portuguese rule in India.

Post-annexation

Status of the new territories 
Free Dadra and Nagar Haveli existed as a de facto independent entity from its independence in 1954 until its merger with the Republic of India in 1961.

Following the annexation of Dadra and Nagar Haveli, Goa, Damaon and Diu became new territories of the Indian Union. Maj Gen K P Candeth was declared as military governor of Goa, Daman and Diu. Goa's first general elections were held in 1963.

In 1967 a referendum was conducted after activists led by Jack Sequeira proposed it, where voters would decide whether to merge Goa into the Marathi-majority state of Maharashtra, the pro-Konkani faction eventually won after protests against the Maharashtrawadi Gomantak Party, led by Dayanand Bandodkar. However full statehood was not conferred immediately, and it was only on 30 May 1987 that Goa became the 25th state of the Indian Union, with Dadra and Nagar Haveli, Daman and Diu districts were partitioned, and continue to be administered as the Damaon, Diu and Silvassa territory.

The most drastic changes in Portuguese India after 1961 were the introduction of democratic elections, as well as the replacement of Portuguese with English as the general language of government and education. Following many years of Konkani language agitation, Konkani in the Devanagari script finally became the official language of the union territory of Goa, Damaon and Diu in 1987. The Indians allowed certain Portuguese institutions to continue unchanged. Amongst these were the land ownership system of the comunidades, where land was held by the community of neighbourhoods was then leased out to individuals. Goans under the Indian Government left the Portuguese Civil Code of Goa and Damaon unchanged, hence they remain as the only territories in India with a common civil code that does not depend on religion.

Citizenship 
The Citizenship Act of 1955 granted the government of India the authority to define citizenship in the Indian union. In exercise of its powers, the government passed the Goa, Daman and Diu (Citizenship) Order, 1962 on 28 March 1962 conferring Indian citizenship on all persons born on or before 20 December 1961 in Goa, Daman, and Diu.

Indo-Portuguese relations 
Portugal's Salazar dictatorship did not recognise India's sovereignty over the annexed territories, and established a government-in-exile for the territories, which continued to be represented in the Portuguese National Assembly. After 1974's Carnation Revolution, the new Portuguese government recognised Indian sovereignty over Goa, Daman and Diu, and the two states restored diplomatic relations. Portugal automatically gives citizens of the former Portuguese-India its citizenship and opened a consulate in Goa in 1994.

Administration

From the moment the State was founded in 1505 till it was disestablished in 1961, an official with the title of governor or viceroy served as its highest authority, usually for a three-year term, initially with authority over all Crown territories east of the Cape of Good Hope. The latter title was attributed as a high honour while the monarchy lasted, however their duties were the same as governors. They were the highest military commanders as well as administrators, hence their authority fell on matters pertaining to the armed forces, diplomacy, trade, finance and personnel management. Before they left Portugal, they were handed a written set of orders and objectives, called regimento. The viceroys often attempted to influence the nomination of political allies to key positions. However, the final say fell on the metropolis. Many were accompanied by their personal retinues, and these often included their sons to serve in important military positions, such was the case of the captain-major of the seas of India Dom Lourenço de Almeida, son the viceroy Dom Francisco de Almeida. After Goa was conquered, governors and viceroys lived in the Palácio do Hidalcão, the native Indian palace built by the city's former sovereign, the Adil Khan.

The most important administrative structure of the State was put in place in the 16th century; it included the high court (relação), the superintendency of finances (vedoria da fazenda) run by a Crown appointed vedor, financial accounts office (casa dos contos) and the military registry and supply office (casa da matrícula).

The extremely scattered nature of Portuguese holdings however, meant that the State was highly decentralized, with great power being held by individual fortress captains, their captain-generals or town halls, far away from Goa. Like the governors and viceroys, fortress captains served for three years, however their terms could be renovated. Sancho de Vasconcelos, captain-major of Ambon served for 19 years. In the most important captaincies, financial authority rested with the vedor (superintendent), while judicial authority was vested in an ouvidor ("ombundsman"). 

The Church played an important role in the State. The Pope had granted the Kings of Portugal exclusive ecclesiastical rights to religious patronage (Padroado) in their overseas possessions. After 1513 Portuguese eastern holdings were part of the bishopric of Funchal seated in Madeira island. After 1557 Goa became the seat of an archbishop with subordinate bishops in Cochin and Malacca. Further sees were later opened in Macau in 1576 and in Funai in 1588. Religious Orders of the Augustinians, Franciscans, Dominicans and Jesuits established mission headquarters in Goa, giving the Catholic Church a very visible presence and influence in the capital of the State of India, for which it earned the nickname of "Rome of the East", a fact commented by many foreign travellers.

In the most important settlements featured a câmara ("town hall"), with charters similar to equivalent cities in Portugal, and they played an important role in administration, as they were the only institution through which settlers could voice their opinions and make themselves heard. They were responsible for local governance, could collect some municipal taxes and acted as a court of first instance. They sometimes provided loans to Viceroys, though cooperation was often difficult. Portuguese merchants often established by their own initiative a câmara in their non-Crown settlements, the most important case of which was the Leal Senado in Macau.

Aside from the Portuguese themselves, the State often also ruled over non-Portuguese, non-Christian peoples, and in these cases often the traditional native structures were left in place. When Afonso de Albuquerque captured Goa, the Hindu inhabitants were left in possession of their lands; the pre-Portuguese system of land-ownership and administration of village communes codified and the rights of Brahmin or Khsatria ganvkars (shareholders) recognized,  and tax collection was left to the Hindu Timoja and after him the long-standing Krishna Rao. In Hormuz, Albuquerque left its native Muslim king as chief administrator under a protectorate. As the Counter-Reformation gained momentum in Europe, Brahmins were excluded from the Portuguese administration during the tenure of Dom Constantino de Bragança, which resulted in a wave of conversions.

Trade and economy

Trade had been one of the primary motivations behind the Portuguese expansion overseas, and one of the main objectives behind the foundation of the State of India was to take over the Europe-Asia trade, up to that point conducted mainly through the Red Sea and the Persian Gulf, redirecting it around Africa via the Cape Route. Trade was processed either by the Crown through royal agents (feitores) working from royal trade posts (feitorias) and maintained by the royal finances, or by independent merchants, either Portuguese or otherwise. 

One of the main tasks of royal factors was to acquire spices to be shipped back to Europe. In 1503, the Portuguese unloaded at Lisbon 30,000 quintals of spices, more than what the Venetians introduced in the European marked through Alexandria in Egypt. The overwhelming bulk of commodities imported to Europe by the Portuguese consisted of black pepper, which after 1520 was declared an official Crown monopoly. The Portuguese acquired most of their pepper in Kerala or Kanara in India. For most of the century, the Portuguese secured an overwhelming share of the pepper imports into Europe, supplying 75 per cent or more of Europes pepper. The Crown declared a monopoly on their commodities, such as cloves, nutmeg, mace, cinnamon, ginger, silk, pearls and the export of gold and silver bullion from Portugal to Asia.

The Portuguese Crown instituted a number of official carreiras, literally meaning "runs", connecting Goa to major Portuguese and non-Portuguese harbours around the Indian and Pacific oceans once a year. Initially conducted through Crown vessels, after 1560, the Crown began leasing them to private contractors, and by the late 16th century they were the norm. By 1580, the value of inter-Asian trade rights leases reached as high as two million cruzados - twice the value the Portuguese Crown earned from the Goa-Lisbon trade. 

Portugal regulated and rerouted the Indian Ocean trade by imposing a system of safe-passes called cartaz. It was imposed most effectively on the west coast of India.  The Portuguese Crown also collected high customs dues, most importantly at Goa, Hormuz, Malacca, Bassein and Diu, and in the 1580s it accounted for over 85% of the viceroys revenue. 

Independent Portuguese merchants got involved in the inter-Asian trade, and the backbone of informal Portuguese presence and trade in Asia was formed of Eurasian merchants, descending from Portuguese soldiers or merchants married to local wives. Their main hub of activities was the capital of Goa, where the largest community of casados ("married men") was located at, about 2,000 families.   The core element of their trade was Gujarati cotton textiles, but they also dealt in Kerala pepper, cinnammon from Sri Lanka, Kanara rice, diamonds from southern India and larins from Persia.   By 1520 they had penetrated almost every commercially relevant region in Asia aside from Japan (which was reached in the 1540s). Macau was founded by independent Portuguese traders. The Crown regulated their trade into a number of convoys for safety against pirates, the most important of which were those which transported textiles from Gujarat to Goa and rice from Kanara to Goa. The second most important settlement of Portuguese merchants in India was Cochin, where 500 casados with their families resided. Diu had a casado population of about 200.

Portuguese India Company was established in 1628, however with the Crown being its only major shareholder, it was liquidated five years later. By that point, Portugal's share of pepper trade had fallen behind those of the Dutch VOC and the English EIC.

Portuguese trade was greatly reduced by the war with the Dutch VOC, with whom a peace treaty was signed in 1663. Inter-Indian Portuguese convoys continued, mainly with Gujarat, Porto Novo and Madras. Indian cottons became the bedrock of exports from Portuguese India, while tobacco grown in Portuguese Brazil became the most important commodity exported across Asia via Portuguese India till the 19th century. New Portuguese East India Companies established in 1669 and 1685 failed, largely due to disagreements between the Crown and the merchants over the nature of the enterprise and lack of confidence from investors. By the 18th century, tobacco, bullion, firearms, consumer goods such as Madeira wine and books represented the most important items traded in Portuguese India, while exports back to Europe included silks, spices, porcelain, precious stones, Indian cottons and high quality lacquered furniture, a good proportion being unloaded at Bahia in Brazil. Indian cottons were especially valuable in Mozambique, where an important community of Indians from Diu or Daman came to reside. Nevertheless, Goa effectively became a commercial satellite of British Bombay. Many Indo-Portuguese merchants became deeply involved and prominent in French Pondicherry, Danish Tranquebar and especially British Madras, Calcutta and Bombay, Portuguese Jews being linked to the diamond trade in Madras.

Society and culture

The State was largely urban, since its reason of being was to provide well-protected havens from which trade and communication could be conducted, controlled and dominated, hence only Goa, Damaon, Bassein, Chaul and Colombo had any meaningful hinterland and rural populations. After the massacre of the Portuguese in their feitoria in Calicut in 1500, practically every possession of the State was fortified, sometimes massively, and for this reason it resembled as much a network of maritime communications as an enormous perimeter of fortresses.

Portuguese India harboured a society that was officially Christian and European but influenced by the non-European setting into which it was inserted. At the top of the social pyramid were the European-born viceroys, officers, and clergymen, followed by the Portuguese casados and their Eurasian descendants, who could be wealthy merchants or hold important positions in the local câmara, and finally the native society. Portuguese living in Asia or east-Africa were generally more accepting of non-Christian beliefs and practices than their countrymen from Europe or Catholic clergy generally approved. At their peak in 1600, the total number of Portuguese casados across the State probably numbered about 5,500. Many casados followed a lifestyle that seemed to foreign visitors as remarkably relaxed and luxurious by European standards, some living in fine houses furnished in the Indian fashion with many servants, abundant and varied food that included a wide variety of fruits and poultry, consumed off Ming porcelain. Goan casados often dressed in shirts and white trousers while their wives usually wore saris.

Alongside fortresses, ecclesiastical buildings dominated the skyline of most Portuguese settlements, particularly in Goa, giving the city a distinctly European and Catholic flavour and a high profile to the Church. About 600 clergymen were concentrated in Goa out of perhaps 1800 east of the Cape of Good Hope in 1630. Nevertheless, the European and Christian Eurasian community in any Portuguese settlement of the State always constituted a minority, perhaps no more than 7% in the case of Goa, the rest being Hindus, Indian Christians, other Asians and Africans, free or slaves. 

For these reasons, the State was culturally hybrid, distant as it was from Europe, with the façades and interiors of churches blending Portuguese and Asian iconographic traditions, while the domestic culture was likewise a compromise between East and West, with furniture, dress and food often more Asian than Portuguese.

Postal history 

Early postal history of the colony is obscure, but regular mail is known to have been exchanged with Lisbon from 1825 onwards. Portugal had a postal convention with Great Britain, so much mail was probably routed through Bombay and carried on British packets. Portuguese postmarks are known from 1854 when a post office was opened in Goa.

The last regular issue for Portuguese India was on 25 June 1960, for the 500th anniversary of the death of Prince Henry the Navigator. Stamps of India were first used on 29 December 1961, although the old stamps were accepted until 5 January 1962. Portugal continued to issue stamps for the lost colony but none were offered for sale in the colony's post offices, so they are not considered valid stamps.

Dual franking was tolerated from 22 December 1961 until 4 January 1962. Colonial (Portuguese) postmarks were tolerated until May 1962.

Gallery

Currency

Architecture

See also 

 Portuguese Empire
 Códice Casanatense
 Japan Voyage
 Estado Novo (Portugal)
 Indo-Portuguese creoles
 List of governors of Portuguese India
 Arquivo Histórico Ultramarino (archives in Lisbon documenting Portuguese Empire, including India)
 Portuguese Indian rupia
 Portuguese Indian escudo
 Goa liberation movement
 Civil code of Goa and Damaon
 Cuncolim Revolt
 Portuguese Bombay and Bassein
 Portuguese Ceylon
 Portuguese Oman
 Colonial India

References

Further reading 

 Andrada (undated). The Life of Dom John de Castro: The Fourth Vice Roy of India. Jacinto Freire de Andrada. Translated into English by Peter Wyche. (1664). Henry Herrington, New Exchange, London. Facsimile edition (1994) AES Reprint, New Delhi. .
Panikkar, K. M. (1953). Asia and Western dominance, 1498–1945, by K.M. Panikkar. London: G. Allen and Unwin.
Panikkar, K. M. 1929: Malabar and the Portuguese: being a history of the relations of the Portuguese with Malabar from 1500 to 1663
 Priolkar, A. K. The Goa Inquisition (Bombay, 1961).

External links 

ColonialVoyage.com – History of the Portuguese and the Dutch in Ceylon, India, Malacca, Bengal, Formosa, Africa, Brazil.
 Biographical entries on Portuguese viceroys and governors of India (1550–1640) in Portuguese – Encyclopedia of the Portuguese Expansion (PDF)

 
Empires and kingdoms of India
India, Portuguese
States and territories established in 1505
India
States and territories disestablished in 1961
History of Kerala
Former countries in South Asia
History of Goa
History of Mumbai
Former colonies in Asia
1505 establishments in Portuguese India
1961 disestablishments in Portuguese India
Portuguese colonisation in Asia